Arthanari is a 2016 Indian Tamil-language action thriller film starring Arundhati and debutante Ramkumar. The film is directed by Sundarra Elangovan. The film was dubbed in Malayalam with the same name and in Hindi as Mumbai Ki Kiran Bedi.

Plot 
Selvamanickam runs an ashram in Chennai, and Karthik grows up there. Sathyapriya, a police officer, gets into a fight with Karthik and later consoles him after learning about his past. They later fall in love. One day, Selvamanickam dies. Karthik assumes that he died a natural death when Sathyapriya tells him that he was murdered. Both Karthik and Sathyapriya want to avenge Selvamanickam's death.

Cast 
Arundhati as Sathyapriya
Ramkumar as Karthik 
Nassar as Selvamanickam 
Rajendran
Abhishek Vinod as Kidnapper
K. Sivasankar as Ramasamy
Vazhukku En Muthuraman
Sampath Ram
Mippu as Karthik's friend
Sudhakar
Thavasi

Production 
The film is directed by Sundarra Elangovan, a former assistant of Bala. Arundhati plays an encounter specialist named Sathyapriya while debutant Ramkumar plays a civil engineer who gets involved in Sathyapriya's case. To prepare for her role, Arundhati watched films from the same genre including  Blue Steel, The Bone Collector and Mardaani. The film was titled as Arthanari because both the male and female characters have equal importance. Nassar plays a supporting role while Rajendran plays the antagonist.

Soundtrack 
The songs are composed by V. Selvaganesh.

Release

Critical reception 
A critic from The Times of India gave the film one and a half out of five stars and wrote that "There are films that have a scrappy feel about them because of their low budget, but this one doesn’t really feel entirely shoddy". Malini Mannath of The New Indian Express wrote that "A stepping stone for a debutant maker, the film could have been an exciting action-flick, if only there had been more clarity and focus in the screenplay and polish in its narrative style". A critic from Samayam gave the film a rating of two out of five stars and praised the directors and Arundhati's performance.

References 

2016 action thriller films
2016 crime action films
2016 crime thriller films
2010s Tamil-language films
2016 films
Fictional portrayals of the Tamil Nadu Police
Indian action thriller films
Indian crime action films
Indian crime thriller films
Indian police films